Sylvan Township is the name of some places in the U.S. state of Michigan:

 Sylvan Township, Osceola County, Michigan
 Sylvan Township, Washtenaw County, Michigan

See also

 Sylvan Township (disambiguation)

Michigan township disambiguation pages